This is a list of the townlands in County Wicklow, Ireland. There are approximately 1,370 names in the list, and duplicates occur where there is more than one townland with the same name in County Wicklow. Names marked in bold typeface are towns and villages, and the word Town appears for those entries in the Acres column.

Townland list

See also
 List of Baronies and Civil Parishes of County Wicklow
 List of baronies of Ireland
 List of civil parishes of Ireland

References

 
Wicklow
County Wicklow-related lists